St. Jude's Cathedral may refer to:

Canada
St. Jude's Cathedral (Iqaluit)

United States
Cathedral of Saint Jude the Apostle (St. Petersburg, Florida)